Iqmik, also called blackbull, is a smokeless tobacco product. It is used in parts of Alaska mainly among Native Americans. Iqmik is made using a mixture of tobacco and the ash of Phellinus igniarius, informally called punk ash.

Prevalence
Over 50% of Yupik-Eskimos are reported to consume Iqmik today. A common belief is that Iqmik is a healthier alternative to commercially available dipping tobacco because there are no added chemicals. However, Iqmik is reported to deliver more nicotine than dipping tobacco. Another reason for high rates of use is its tradition in the Native society. Even young children use Iqmik in the remote villages of Alaska. Of all smokeless tobacco use across Alaska, Iqmik accounts for 16% of use.

The ingredients for Iqmik can be purchased at general stores in Western Alaska. Typically, Iqmik is prepared by the user, by purchasing tobacco leaf and punk ash separately and then combining them.

References

Tobacco in the United States